

Bruno Ritter von Hauenschild (9 June 1896 – 10 March 1953), born Bruno Hauenschild, was a general in the Wehrmacht of Nazi Germany during World War II

Hauenschild served in World War I; at the beginning of World War II, he rejoined the army as an officer. From 15 April to 12 September 1942, Hauenschild commanded the 24th Panzer Division. On 26 January 1945 Hauenschild was given command of the III Military District  headquartered in Berlin. Hauenschild commanded the III Military District until 15 March. He was relieved of command of the Berlin Defense Area on 6 March due to illness and was replaced by Lieutenant-General (Generalleutnant) Helmuth Reymann.

Awards and decorations
 Iron Cross (1914) 2nd Class (21 May 1915) & 1st Class (6 December 1917)
 Knight's Cross of the Royal House Order of Hohenzollern with Swords
 Knight's Cross of the Military Order of Max Joseph (2 September 1918)
 Clasp to the Iron Cross (1939) 2nd Class (24 September 1939) & 1st Class (19 October 1939)
 Knight's Cross of the Iron Cross with Oak Leaves
 Knight's Cross on 25 August 1941 as Oberst and commander of 4. Panzer-Brigade
 129th Oak Leaves on 27 September 1942 as Generalmajor and commander of 24. Panzer-Division

References

Citations

Bibliography

 
 

1896 births
1953 deaths
Military personnel from Würzburg
Lieutenant generals of the German Army (Wehrmacht)
German Army personnel of World War I
People from the Kingdom of Bavaria
Knights of the Military Order of Max Joseph
Recipients of the Knight's Cross of the Iron Cross with Oak Leaves
Recipients of the clasp to the Iron Cross, 1st class